The Piorini River is a river in Amazonas state in north-western Brazil. It ends in the Badajos River.

See also
List of rivers of Amazonas

References
Brazilian Ministry of Transport

Rivers of Amazonas (Brazilian state)
Tributaries of the Amazon River